Bonifacio Veronese, birth name: Bonifacio de' Pitati (1487 – 19 October 1553) was an Italian Renaissance painter who was active in the Venetian Republic.  His work had an important influence on the younger generation of painters in Venice, particularly Andrea Schiavone and Jacopo Tintoretto.

Life
The artist was born in Verona from which his family moved to Venice around 1505. Here, the young artist reputedly trained under Palma il Vecchio. He was initially a close follower of il Vecchio. He ran a large workshop in Venice, which could execute small devotional works as well as large painting projects.  His early work also shows his knowledge of Giorgione and Titian

He created a large series of narrative paintings for the Palazzo dei Camerlenghi.  It took 20 years to complete the project.

His style was influenced by that of Giorgione and Titian.  From the 1530s the artist introduced some figurative elements of central Italian origin derived mainly from Raphael. During those years he made a fortune in Venice Many cassoni and furniture decorations are attributed to him.

He is said to have had a lasting influence on Andrea Schiavone and Tintoretto. He died in Venice.

Works attributed to the artist

Repose in Egypt (also ascribed to Paris Bordone), Pitti Palace.
Sibyl with the Emperor Augustus (also ascribed to Paris Bordone).
Finding of Moses (formerly attributed to Giorgione). Milan. Brera.
Finding of Moses (formerly given Modena. Gall. Adoration of the Kings. to Giorgione).
Holy Family (formerly called a Titian or Bordone, Colonna Palace, Rome.
Christ and the Adulteress, National Museum, Warsaw.
Holy Family with St. John the Baptist, Wawel Castle, Kraków.
The rich man and Lazarus 1540 Gallerie dell'Accademia Venice

References

Further reading

External links

Italian Paintings, Venetian School, a collection catalog containing information about Veronese and his works (see index; plate 11).

1487 births
1553 deaths
Painters from Verona
15th-century Italian painters
Italian male painters
16th-century Italian painters
Italian Mannerist painters